Molly Bloom (born April 21, 1978) is an American entrepreneur, speaker, and author of the 2014 memoir Molly's Game. She had trained for years to become an Olympic skier, but was injured while trying to qualify for the Olympics.

In April 2013, she was charged with running a high-stakes poker game that originated in the Viper Room in Los Angeles, which attracted wealthy people, sports figures, and Hollywood celebrities. In May 2014, after pleading guilty to reduced charges, she was sentenced to one year of probation, a $200,000 fine, and 200 hours of community service. In addition, she was required to forfeit $125,000 in earnings from the games she operated.

A film adaptation of her book, Molly's Game, starring Jessica Chastain and directed by Aaron Sorkin, debuted in December 2017.

Early life
Bloom was born on April 21, 1978, and grew up in Loveland, Colorado. Her father, Larry Bloom, is a clinical psychologist and a professor at Colorado State University. Her mother, Char, was a ski and snowboard instructor and a professional fly-fisher with her own line of clothing. Bloom's father is Jewish and her mother is Christian. Her brothers are Jordan Bloom, a cardiac surgeon at Massachusetts General Hospital, and Jeremy Bloom, who was an American Olympic skier and professional American football player with the Philadelphia Eagles. She was a competitive skier and at one time ranked third in Nor-Am Cup season ranking for women's moguls skiers; she later suffered an injury while trying to qualify for the Olympics. She attended the University of Colorado Boulder, where she graduated summa cum laude with a Bachelor of Arts in Political Science.

Career 
In 2004, Bloom moved to Los Angeles and found work as a bartender. In 2004, Darin Feinstein, one of the co-owners of The Viper Room nightclub, was approached by actor Tobey Maguire about hosting a high-stakes poker game in the basement of the club. Feinstein recruited Bloom to cater to the players and manage the game. In 2007, Bloom started her own business, registering Molly Bloom Inc. as an event and catering company to host poker tournaments. By 2008, the games had graduated to private homes and hotels like the Peninsula Beverly Hills, with hands going as high as $4 million. In addition to Maguire, many wealthy people, celebrities and sports figures were known to frequent the games including Leonardo DiCaprio, Alec Gores, Macaulay Culkin, Matt Damon, Ben Affleck, Alex Rodriguez, Nelly, Mary Kate Olsen, Ashley Olsen, Phil Ivey, Rick Salomon and Andy Beal.

The onset of the 2008 recession made underground poker games less common, and in 2009, Bloom moved to an Upper West Side high-rise near Manhattan's Lincoln Center. She began organizing games in a private apartment at the new Astor Place and suites at the Plaza Hotel, which used the same sophisticated dealing equipment used in casinos, and which were staffed by women hired from 1 Oak, an exclusive nightclub. However, Bloom had fewer contacts in New York, where raids on underground games prompted them to relocate to Long Island. As a result of this, Bloom attracted rich businessmen from Wall Street but also more disreputable gamblers whose bids were significantly smaller than those in Los Angeles. In June 2010, Bloom was served with a $116,133 tax lien for failing to pay appropriate taxes on her New York events.

Arrest and sentencing 
In 2011, one of Bloom's games in Los Angeles was shut down as part of a bankruptcy investigation into a Ponzi scheme run by Bradley Ruderman, one of the players. Bloom, who had received money from Ruderman as part of the game, was accused of receiving $473,000 from Ruderman's bank to settle his debts and sued by the bankruptcy trustee for $473,200, but she denied that she was involved in organizing illegal gambling. Bank records showed 19 transfers to Bloom in 2007 and 2008 for amounts up to $57,500.

On April 16, 2013, Bloom was arrested and charged along with 33 others as part of a $100 million money laundering and illegal sports gambling operation. Preet Bharara, the United States Attorney for the Southern District of New York, charged 12 people with racketeering. Others were charged with money laundering, extortion, fraud and operating illegal poker rooms in New York City. Bloom, who was 34 at the time, faced a maximum penalty of 10 years in prison, six years of supervised release, a fine of $1.5 million or twice the amount gained from the crimes or twice the amount lost by victims, and a $200 special assessment.

In May 2014, Bloom pleaded guilty to a lesser charge and was sentenced to one year of probation and 200 hours of community service. At the sentencing, Bloom's lawyer, Jim Walden, told the court that Bloom was in severe debt which included forfeiting $125,000 in poker proceeds as part of the plea. He stated that Bloom had "been ordered into the gambling business" by her boss at a Los Angeles real estate company, then went on to create her own illegal poker game in New York in 2009. Assistant U.S. Attorney Joshua Naftalis said in the government's sentencing brief that "huge sums of money were wagered at these games" and that "for a time, her games were likely the biggest games in New York." He told the judge at the sentencing that the government believed that Bloom played a "minor role" in the operation compared to many of the others who were charged, and recommended a sentence that included no jail time.

Book and film 
Bloom's memoir about her experiences, Molly's Game, was published in 2014.

A film adaptation of the book, also called Molly's Game, written and directed by Aaron Sorkin, premiered at the Toronto Film Festival on September 8, 2017. Jessica Chastain plays the role of Molly Bloom. The film received a 2018 Academy Award nomination in the category Best Adapted Screenplay.

References

External links
 
 Molly Bloom poker interview (video)

1978 births
Living people
People from Loveland, Colorado
American writers
American people of Jewish descent
Jewish American writers
21st-century American businesspeople
21st-century American businesswomen